Arbour-Fuller Hospital is a 103-bed private psychiatric hospital in South Attleboro, Massachusetts. It is known for caring for people with psychological and substance abuse disorders. The hospital has a unit for adults with  intellectual disabilities, and a unit for dealing for teens with various psychological and substance addiction issues. It contains dual units as well as a detox and has a partial hospital program. It also has general psychotic units for adults. The hospital is owned by Arbour Health system which is owned by Universal Health Services.

In 2016, the US Department of Justice announced that it was investigating the hospital for billing fraud.

References

Psychiatric hospitals in Massachusetts